The Alteromonadales are an order of Pseudomonadota. Although they have been treated as a single family, the Alteromonadaceae, they were divided into eight by Ivanova et al. in 2004. The cells are straight or curved rods. They are motile by the use of a single flagellum. Most of the species are marine.

References 

 George M. Garrity: Bergey's Manual of Systematic Bacteriology. 2. Auflage. Springer, New York, 2005, Volume 2: The Proteobacteria, Part B: The Gammaproteobacteria
 Elena P. Ivanova, Sebastien Flavier, and Richard Christen. (2004). Phylogenetic relationships among marine Alteromonas-like proteobacteria: emended description of the family Alteromonadaceae and proposal of Pseudoalteromonadaceae fam. nov., Colwelliaceae fam. nov., Shewanellaceae fam. nov., Moritellaceae fam. nov., Ferrimonadaceae fam. nov., Idiomarinaceae fam. nov. and Psychromonadaceae fam. nov. , International Journal of Systematic and Evolutionary Microbiology 54: 1773–1788.

 
Gammaproteobacteria